Palmer Edwin Lee (January 25, 1927 – October 31, 2015), known by his stage name Gregg Palmer, was an American film and television actor.

Born in San Francisco, California, Palmer served in the United States Army Air Corps as a cryptographer in World War II. He began his acting career in 1950 with the uncredited role of an ambulance driver in the film My Friend Irma Goes West.

Palmer guest-starred in numerous television programs, including Gunsmoke, Bonanza, Wagon Train, Kolchak: The Night Stalker, The Virginian, The Wild Wild West, Rawhide, Star Trek: The Original Series, Mannix, Mission: Impossible and Death Valley Days. He also appeared in films, including Big Jake, Magnificent Obsession, To Hell and Back, The Shootist, The Rebel Set, Zombies of Mora Tau, Taza, Son of Cochise, Francis Goes to West Point and The Creature Walks Among Us. Palmer played Tom McLowery in the western television series The Life and Legend of Wyatt Earp. Palmer retired in 1982, his last credit being in the miniseries The Blue and the Gray.

Palmer died in October 2015 in Encino, California, at the age of 88.

References

External links 

Rotten Tomatoes profile

1927 births
2015 deaths
Male actors from San Francisco
Military personnel from California
American male film actors
American male television actors
20th-century American male actors
American people of Norwegian descent
Male Western (genre) film actors
Western (genre) television actors